The Woman Who Did Not Care is a 1927 American silent drama film directed by Phil Rosen and starring Lilyan Tashman, Edward Martindel and Philo McCullough.

Cast
 Lilyan Tashman as Iris Carroll 
 Edward Martindel as Franklin Payne 
 Arthur Rankin as Jeffrey Payne 
 Philo McCullough as Gregory Payne 
 Olive Hasbrouck as Diana Payne 
 Sarah Padden as Mrs. Carroll 
 Guinn 'Big Boy' Williams as Lars

References

Bibliography
 Munden, Kenneth White. The American Film Institute Catalog of Motion Pictures Produced in the United States, Part 1. University of California Press, 1997.

External links
 

1927 films
1927 drama films
1920s English-language films
American silent feature films
Silent American drama films
Films directed by Phil Rosen
American black-and-white films
Gotham Pictures films
1920s American films